Marc Frédérix (1919–2004) was a French art director. He was nominated for an Academy Award in the category Best Art Direction for the film Is Paris Burning?

Selected filmography
 Is Paris Burning? (1966)

References

External links

1919 births
2004 deaths
French art directors
Film people from Paris